The Harmening High Flyer is an American powered parachute that was designed and produced by Harmening's High Flyers of Genoa, Illinois.

The aircraft was introduced in 1988 and production ended when the company went out of business in circa 2008.

Design and development
The aircraft was designed to be a single-place or optionally two-seater. The base model High Flyer features an MK Superfit rip-stop nylon parachute-style high-wing, tricycle landing gear and a single  2si 460-F engine in pusher configuration. Variants use other engines.

The aircraft is built from a combination of bolted 6061-T6 aluminium, welded 4130 steel tubing and mild steel. In flight steering is accomplished via foot pedals that actuate the canopy brakes, creating roll and yaw. On the ground the aircraft has lever-controlled nosewheel steering. The main landing gear incorporates sprung steel suspension. The aircraft was factory supplied in the form of an assembly kit that requires 30–40 hours to complete.

Reviewer Andre Cliche described the aircraft as "a proven design".

Operational history
By 1998 the company reported that 75 kits had been sold and 75 aircraft were completed and flying.

Variants
High Flyer
Base model with  two-stroke 2si 460-F engine. Cost was US$9,500 in 2001.
High Flyer Standard
Model with  two stroke Rotax 503 engine. Cost was US$9,395 in 2000. Twenty-five completed and flown by early 2000.
High Flyer Deluxe
Model with  Rotax 503 engine and larger fuel tank. Cost was US$9,895 in 2000. Twenty-five completed and flown by early 2000.
High Flyer Premiere
Model with  four-stroke HKS 700E engine. Cost was US$14,980 in 2000. Thirty completed and flown by early 2000.
High Flyer Executive
Model with  two-stroke Hirth 2706 engine. Cost was US$11,999 in 2000. Thirty completed and flown by early 2000.
High Five
Model with  two-stroke Rotax 582 engine. Cost was US$12,250 in 2005. Ten completed and flown by early 2005.

Specifications (High Flyer Executive)

References

External links
Company website archives on Archive.org

Harmening High Flyer
1980s United States ultralight aircraft
Single-engined pusher aircraft
Powered parachutes